Currall is a surname. Notable people with the surname include:

Alan Currall (born 1964), British artist
Eliza Currall (1855–1927), English watercress grower and entrepreneur
Steven C. Currall, American psychological scientist and academic administrator

Gaelic-language surnames